Morgan, Walls & Clements was an architectural firm based in Los Angeles, California and responsible for many of the city's landmarks, dating back to the late 19th century. Originally Morgan and Walls, with principals Octavius Morgan and John A. Walls, the firm worked in the area from before the turn of the century.

Around 1910 Morgan's son O.W. Morgan was promoted, the elder Morgan retired, and with the emergence of designer Stiles O. Clements (1883–1966) the firm hit its stride with a series of theaters and commercial projects around MacArthur Park. Clements often worked in Spanish Colonial revival and Mayan revival styles, but their major project was the black Art Deco Richfield Tower, a commanding presence in downtown from its 1928 completion to its 1969 destruction. Walls did not live to see the completion of the building, as he had died in 1922.

Clements left the firm in 1937 to start his own practice, Stiles O. Clements & Associates, where he remained until his retirement in 1965.

Works
Their work includes:
 Grand Opera House, 110 S. Main St., Los Angeles, 1884 (Octavius Morgan and Ezra F. K
 Bullard Block, housing The Hub department store, 154-160 N. Main St., Los Angeles, 1895 (demolished 1925)
 The Bumiller Building, Los Angeles, 1906
 Parmelee-Dohrmann Building, 436–444 S. Broadway, Los Angeles, 1906 (demolished)
Arcade Theater, 500 block of S. Broadway, Los Angeles, 1910
Title Guarantee Block, now Jewelry Trades Building, 500 S. Broadway, Los Angeles 1913
 Van Nuys Apartments, Los Angeles, 1913
 The Haas Building, Los Angeles, 1915
 The Olive J. Cobb Building, Los Angeles, 1924
 El Capitan Theatre, Los Angeles, 1926
 Hollywood Chamber of Commerce Building, Los Angeles, 1926
 Music Box Theater, Los Angeles, 1926
 Belasco Theater, Los Angeles, 1926
 Ninth & Hill Building, Los Angeles, 1926
 Mayan Theater, Los Angeles, 1927
 Downtown Shopping News, Printing & Distribution Building, Los Angeles, 1927
 The First National Bank of Orange, Orange, 1928
 The Adams Square Building (1100 E. Chevy Chase Dr), Glendale, 1928
 Chapman Plaza, 3400 Block W. 6th St., Los Angeles, 1929
 The Deco Building, 1929
 Richfield Tower, Los Angeles, 1929 (razed)
 Samson Tire and Rubber Factory (now Citadel Outlets), Commerce, California, 1929-30.  The façade was based on the palace of Sargon II.
 Security First National Bank, Los Angeles, 1929
 Adamson House, Malibu, California, 1930 
 Leimert Theatre, Leimert Park, Los Angeles, 1931
 Pellissier Building and Wiltern Theatre, Los Angeles, 1931
 Dominguez-Wilshire Building (5410 Wilshire Boulevard), Los Angeles, 1931
 Professional Building, Phoenix, Arizona, 1932
 The Blackstone Building (Los Angeles), refurbished 1939

References 

 Emporis.com: the works of Morgan, Walls & Clements

 01
Defunct architecture firms based in California
Architects from Los Angeles